Greek influence was widespread throughout the Balkans during the Middle Ages, influencing the languages within it, including Serbo-Croatian. Many words of Greek origin were borrowed from other languages, while most others came via contact with the Greeks. Some words are present and common in the modern vernaculars of Serbo-Croatian: hiljada (хиљада), tiganj (тигањ), patos (патос). Almost every word of the Serbian Orthodox ceremonies are of Greek origin: parastos (парастос).

AG stands for Ancient Greek origin.
MG stands for Modern Greek origin.
C  stands for Cyrillic (script).
L stands for Latin (script).

See also
 Arabic-Persian-Greek-Serbian Conversation Textbook

References

Greek Origin
Greek Origin
Greek Origin
Greek Origin
Greek Origin
Linguistics lists
Lists of loanwords